The German sIG 33 howitzer was mounted on a number of mounts to produce a self-propelled gun. The first appeared in 1940, and improved versions were still in production in 1944.

History
The Invasion of Poland had shown that the sIG 33s assigned to the infantry gun companies of the motorized infantry regiments had difficulties keeping up with the tanks during combat. The easiest solution was to use a spare tank chassis to carry it into battle. It was first mounted on a Panzer I chassis and given a lightly armored superstructure. This produced an adequate vehicle, but with a very high center of gravity and an overloaded chassis. As a result, only a few dozen were built. Since the over-loaded Panzer I chassis was too small for the gun, production switched to models using the chassis of larger, more suitable tanks. In 1942, the Panzer II chassis was modified to accept the sIG 33. This version also received better armour protection. Eventually, production switched to a modified version of the Panzer III and later still to the Panzer 38(t).

Guns
The early vehicles used ordinary sIG 33s, but an sIG 33/1 was developed for use on later vehicles. The 15 cm Sturmhaubitze 43 gun used on the Sturmpanzer IV was an entirely new design developed by Skoda that used the same ammunition as the sIG 33.

Notes

References

External links
http://www.wwiivehicles.com/germany/self-propelled/bison.asp

World War II self-propelled artillery of Germany
150 mm artillery